1001 Nights is a Canadian animated television series developed and produced at Big Bad Boo Studios in Vancouver, based on stories from One Thousand and One Nights. The show is created and co-directed by Shabnam Rezaei and Aly Jetha.

Borrowing from the original premise of the classical tales of One Thousand and One Nights, the TV series features Scheherazade, the storyteller, in a Persian court with her sister Donyazad, King Shahryar, Prince Shahzaman and a playful monkey named Maymoon. The show premiered on Teletoon in Canada on December 25, 2011 and on Radio Canada in French-speaking Canada. In the United States, the show premiered on Disney Channel on January 2, 2012. This is the first time a media company has serialized the books of One Thousand and One Nights into an animated TV series for children.

Premise
Another day at King Shahryar's court and another problem presents itself. Does Shahryar have a toothache? Is Maymoon "borrowing" Shahzaman's pistachios? Scheherazade always has a delightful story that will entertain and teach everyone a great lesson.  She will often use the court characters in her stories. There are also a number of recurring characters such as Sinbad and Dina, Mujab and Samir and Harun al-Rashid. A red herring is presented in each episode such as a flying carpet which leaves room for the stories to continue.

Episodes

Season 1

Season 2

Characters

Scheherazade
Voiced by Nicole Oliver

Confident and older than her years, Scheherazade is savvy, quick-witted, and no nonsense in her dealings with Donyazad and Shahzaman. She is the wife of King Shahryar. She serves the role of mother, educator and peace-keeper and it is through her that we are told many captivating stories. Scheherazade lives in the palace and is the daughter of Majid, Shahryar's vizier.

Shahryar
Voiced by Colin Murdock

Shahryar is slightly older than his wife Scheherazade, and has little experience or knowledge of what it takes to make a good king. He is unintentionally selfish, arrogant, pompous, and spoiled. He is also innocent and childlike because he is a prince who has been catered to his entire life. He says whatever is on his mind, no matter how bumbling or stupid it might sound. Often when Scheherazade is telling a story to the kids, Shahryar is listening in and will draw the wrong message.

Donyazad
Voiced by Tabitha St. Germain

Donyazad is Scheherazade's younger sister. She is ten years old, bright, independent, and feisty. She loves and respects her older sister who has essentially become her mother figure. Donyazad often tussles with Shahazman. Although they are not related, they have a typical brother-sister relationship. They are close to one another but are often at odds. Of the two, Donyazad is the smarter. She's also more sensitive and aware.

Shahzaman
Voiced by Cathy Weseluck

Shahzaman is Shahryar's eleven-year-old brother and therefore, he is a prince. He is a younger version of Shahryar, i.e. spoiled with a sense of entitlement. Even though he's a prince, he is like any other boy who loves sports, games, sweets, and play time. He gets into mischief and he endlessly teases Donyazad. He's a practical joker and often insensitive to other people's feelings. Still, he's loveable and when faced with issues, he and Donyazad make a good team.

Majid
Voiced by Peter Kelamis

Majid is Shahryar's vizier, i.e. high counselor. He is also Scheherazade's father. He is about fifty years old and supposedly the wise and learned man of the court. Majid frequently finds himself trying to calm Shahryar down when the king is throwing a temper tantrum. He is sycophantic towards Shahryar whereas Scheherazade is smarter and subtler in her approach. She's often able to change Shahryar's behavior just by telling him a story. Whereas Majid is often afraid of his son-in-law, Scheherazade has no trouble standing up to him.

Maymoon
Voiced by Scott McNeil

Maymoon is a mischievous pet monkey who belongs to Shahzaman. He is playful and loving and is a regular member of the court. He often outwits Shahryar and like all the other characters is used often as a character in Scheherazade's stories.

Production history
The idea for the show came to co-creator Shabnam Rezaei in a dream. Her father read stories from One Thousand and One Nights in her native country Iran. Together with partner Aly Jetha, Series and Creative Director Chad Van De Keere, story editor Randy Rogel as well as the Big Bad Boo team, they formulated the 1001 Nights TV series, which would be appropriate for a modern audience.

Reception
1001 Nights came in the # 1 show at the 2011 at the Mip Junior awards among 1027 other children's properties. It was a finalist in the 2010 Mip Junior Licensing Challenge and # 6 in the Top 30 that year.

Awards and nominations (2010)
1001 Nights was nominated for four awards in 2010.

Awards and nominations (2011)
1001 Nights was nominated for two awards in 2011.

Awards and nominations (2012)
1001 Nights was nominated and won three Leo Awards in 2012.

Awards and nominations (2013)
1001 Nights was nominated for two Leo Awards and won one in 2013.

References

External links 

1001 Nights TV series website
Big Bad Boo 1001 Nights Property Page

2010s Canadian animated television series
2011 Canadian television series debuts
Television series based on books
Canadian flash animated television series
Canadian children's animated fantasy television series
Epic television series
Works based on One Thousand and One Nights
English-language television shows